"Supersoaker" is a song by American rock band Kings of Leon. The song was written by Caleb Followill, Nathan Followill, Jared Followill, and Matthew Followill and produced by Angelo Petraglia. It was released on July 17, 2013 as the lead single from their sixth studio album Mechanical Bull (2013), and peaked at number 32 on the UK Singles Chart.

On September 24, 2013, Kings of Leon performed "Supersoaker" on ABC's morning show  Good Morning America.

Music video
The music video for the song was directed by W.I.Z. The clip, which shows a love story set in the 1950s, was described by W.I.Z. as "an imagined hybrid of pop-art screenprint, hand tinting and Technicolour film". W.I.Z. also explained that "[We wanted] playful, sensual ideas of teen angst, rock and roll and Americana; we wanted to a make a piece that was urgent as well as effortless, precision with abandon".

Track listings
 Digital download
 "Supersoaker" – 3:50

 7" vinyl single
 "Supersoaker" – 3:50
 "Work on Me" – 4:04

Charts and certifications

Weekly charts

Year-end charts

Certifications

Release history

References

Kings of Leon songs
2013 singles
2013 songs
RCA Records singles
Songs written by Caleb Followill
Songs written by Jared Followill
Songs written by Matthew Followill
Songs written by Nathan Followill